TPAC may refer to:

Tactical Pursuit And Containment, a term used in police pursuits in the United Kingdom.
Taipei Performing Arts Center, a performing arts center under construction in Taipei, Taiwan.
Tennessee Performing Arts Center, a performing arts facility in Nashville, Tennessee.
Transpacific flight, a flight that crosses the Pacific Ocean.

See also
 Tupac